Ernie Davis Academy, formerly Elmira Free Academy, is the junior high school in Elmira, New York, United States. In September 2014 it merged with Southside High School (now Elmira High School). It has 855 students in grades 7–8 with a student-teacher ratio of 13 to 1. According to state test scores, 18 percent of students are at least proficient in math and 22 percent in reading.

The metro-area surrounding Ernie Davis Academy is both economically and racially diverse, traits reflected in the student body. 77 percent of the student body is White, 20 percent is Black, 2 percent Hispanic, less than 1 percent Asian or Pacific Islander, and less than 1 percent Native American. 38 percent of the student body qualified for free or reduced lunches, a percentage significantly higher than the state average of 17 percent.

History 
Started in 1859 under the Jurisdiction of a Board of Education, EFA had many locations and upgrades as the City grew.

Elmira Free Academy moved to Hoffman St in 1969.

The school also boasted many honors courses, taught to the standards of both AP and ACE (a program that offers direct college credits at many schools). Elmira Free Academy was also a strong statewide contender in many sports, despite a smaller  student enrollment and budget than many competing schools. The school was classified as class A in Section IV of the NYSPHSAA.

Every fall, Southside High School and EFA competed in football for the Erie Bell. In 2011, however, the Elmira City School District announced that due to severe budget problems, the 64-year-old rivalry between Southside and EFA would have to come to an end. The two high schools combined their sports teams by the 2011–12 school year. A community vote was taken to determine what new mascot and colors people were interested in. On May 25, 2011, the district officially announced that the new team would be called the Elmira Express, a common nickname for Elmiran legend Ernie Davis, the first African-American to ever win college football's Heisman Trophy. The colors will be red, black, and white. 
The Elmira City School District decided to make EFA the middle school and Southside the high school during the 2013–14 school year which began to operate officially by September 2014.

Elmira Free Academy was renamed Ernie Davis Academy due to the closure of Ernie Davis Middle School. The new Ernie Davis Academy was an eighth and ninth grade school. The campus was changed to seventh and eighth grades beginning the fall of 2020, but remained as eighth and ninth grade in response to the COVID-19 pandemic. This allowed for social distancing at Elmira High School which housed grades ten through twelve.

Notable alumni
Hal Roach (1908) – Film and TV producer with a career spanning much of the 20th century. In 1984, he won the honorary Academy Honorary Award for Lifetime Achievement.
Ernie Davis (1958) – First African American to win the Heisman Trophy, and two time All-American. Drafted by Washington Redskins and traded to Cleveland Browns before he died from leukemia in 1963.
Bob DeLaney (1942) – Sports announcer 
Tommy Hilfiger (1969) – Fashion designer and creator of the eponymous "Tommy Hilfiger" and "Tommy" brands.
Eileen Collins (1974) – Retired Astronaut, first female pilot, commander of the Space Shuttle

Principals

Colin Werfelman: 2022–Present
Carrie Rollins: 2014–2021
John Wood: 2013–2014 (beginning of Ernie Davis Academy)
Chris Krantz: 2012–2013 (end of Elmira Free Academy)
John Wood: 2008–2012
Scott Williams: 2006–2008
Robert Bailey III: 2000–2006
John Walker: 1996–2000
Theodore V. Faber: 1995–1996
Cynthia H. Haigh: 1994–1995
Joseph H. Nikiel: 1988–1994
Daile Rose: 1984–1988
Dr.William J Doran: 1981–1984
Martin Harrigan: 1973–1980
G. Ellsworth Bradley: 1969–1973
Kenneth S. Weaver: 1954–1969
Albert Helmkamp: 1936–1954
Francis Parker: 1906–1936
Howard Conant: 1900–1906
Charles Evans: 1895–1900
Herbert Lovell: 1887–1895
James Monks: 1872–1887
Joel Dorman Steele: 1866–1872
G.W. Timlow: 1865–1866
Isaac Mortimer Wellington: 1860–1865
Moses Summer Converse: 1859–1860

References

External links
Elmira Free Academy

Public high schools in New York (state)
Buildings and structures in Elmira, New York
Schools in Chemung County, New York
1859 establishments in New York (state)